Mohammadabad-e Moshk (also Romanized as Moḩammadābād-e Moshk; also known as Mahammābād, Moḩammadābād, Moḩammadābād-e Moshg, Moḩammadābād-e Posht-e Rīg, and Muhammadābād) is a village in Rud Ab-e Sharqi Rural District, Rud Ab District, Narmashir County, Kerman Province, Iran. At the 2006 census, its population was 188, in 40 families.

References 

Populated places in Narmashir County